Lèse-majesté or lese-majesty is an offence against the dignity of a ruling head of state (traditionally a monarch but now more often a president) or the state itself. The English name for this crime is a borrowing from the French, where it means "a crime against The Crown."

This behaviour was first classified as a criminal offence against the dignity of the Roman Republic of ancient Rome. In the Dominate, or Late Empire period, the emperors eliminated the republican trappings of their predecessors and began to equate the state with themselves. Although legally the princeps civitatis (his official title, meaning, roughly, 'first citizen') could never become a sovereign because the republic was never officially abolished, emperors were deified as divus, first posthumously but by the Dominate period while reigning. Deified emperors enjoyed the same legal protection that was accorded to the divinities of the state cult; by the time it was replaced by Christianity, what was in all but name a monarchical tradition had already become well-established.

Narrower conceptions of offences against Majesty as offences against the crown predominated in the European kingdoms that emerged in the early medieval period. In feudal Europe, some crimes were classified as lèse-majesté even if they were not intentionally directed against the crown. An example is counterfeiting, so classified because coins bore the monarch's effigy and/or coat of arms.

With the disappearance of absolute monarchy in Europe, lèse-majesté came to be viewed as less of a crime. However, certain malicious acts that would have once been classified as the crime of lèse-majesté could still be prosecuted as treason. Future republics that emerged as great powers generally still classified as a crime any offence against the highest representatives of the state. These laws are still applied as well in monarchies outside of Europe, notably in modern Thailand and Cambodia.

Current laws

Europe

Belarus 
On 31 January 2022, a woman in Belarus was handed an 18-month prison sentence for "insulting" the country’s authoritarian ruler, Alexander Lukashenko and other authorities after pictures mocking the officials were found on her phone. There have been other similar sentences particularly since Lukashenko claimed he won an election in August 2020 which independent observers reported that he lost.

Belgium 
On 28 October 2021, Belgium's Constitutional Court ruled that a law dating from 1847 which penalised insulting the monarch with a fine or imprisonment violates the right to freedom of expression as guaranteed under the Belgian Constitution as well as the European Convention on Human Rights. A proposal to repeal the 1847 law will be made in Parliament.

Denmark 
In Denmark, the monarch is protected by the usual libel paragraph (§ 267 of the Danish Penal Code which allows for up to four months of imprisonment), but §115 allows for doubling of the usual punishment when the reigning monarch is target of the libel. When a queen consort, queen dowager or the crown prince is the target, the punishment may be increased by 50%. There are no historical records of §115 having ever been used, but in March 2011, Greenpeace activists who unfurled a banner at a dinner at the 2009 United Nations Climate Change Conference were charged under this section. They received minor sentences for other crimes, but were acquitted of the charge relating to the monarch.

Estonia

Insulting a foreign dignitary, its representatives or family members, desecrating flag or anthem can be punished by up to two years of imprisonment according to the Penal Code § 247 and § 249

Germany

Until 2017, it was illegal to publicly insult foreign heads of state. On 25 January 2017, the German justice minister Heiko Maas announced a decision by the cabinet to remove this law from the German criminal code, effective 1 January 2018. The decision came several months after Chancellor Angela Merkel announced in April 2016 a controversial decision to honour the Turkish government's request to prosecute a German comedian for reading an obscene poem about Turkish president Recep Tayyip Erdoğan on late-night television. In that announcement, Merkel also stated the intention to consider repeal of the little-known law. The prosecution was dropped in November 2016.

Insulting the federal president is still illegal, but prosecution requires the authorisation of the president.

Iceland
Insulting a country, foreign head of state, its representatives or flag can be punished by up to two years of imprisonment according to the 95th article of the penal code. For a very serious breach the term can be extended to six years.

Italy
Impugning the honour or prestige of the president of Italy or the Pope (his legal position in the Italian penal system is parified with the Italian head of state by virtue of the Lateran Treaty) is punishable with one to five years in jail. This includes personal offences made regarding their exercise of powers or otherwise, with no distinction between past or current events or between the public and private spheres.

Former leader of the Northern League Umberto Bossi was sentenced to a year and 15 days in jail after using the racial slur terrone in reference to the at the time president Giorgio Napolitano's southern origins, but was later pardoned by the then president Sergio Mattarella.

Similarly, it is also illegal to violate the prestige of foreign flags and emblems; a similar law concerning foreign heads of state was repealed in 1999.

Netherlands
In 1966, Dutch cartoonist Willem depicted queen Juliana of the Netherlands as a prostitute in a cartoon published in Provo magazine, "God, Nederland en Oranje". He was sued for lèse-majesté, but the judge eventually acquitted him from the charge. Willem moved to France afterwards.

Lèse-majesté of the King was punishable with up to five years in prison and/or a fine. The insulting of the Royal Consort, the heir apparent or their consort, or the Regent, was punishable by four years in prison and/or a fine. In the same vein, the insulting of an allied head of state, who is in the Netherlands in their official capacity, was punishable by up to two years and/or a fine.

In total, 18 prosecutions were brought under the law between 2000 and 2012, half of which resulted in convictions. In October 2007, a 47-year-old man was sentenced to one week's imprisonment and fined €400 for, amongst other things, lèse-majesté in the Netherlands when he called Queen Beatrix a "whore" and told a police officer that he would have anal sex with her because "she would like it". In July 2016, a 44-year-old man was sentenced to 30 days in jail for 'intentionally insulting' King Willem-Alexander, accusing him of being a murderer, thief and rapist.

These laws have been abolished as of January 1, 2020. Insulting the King, the Royal Consort, the heir apparent or their consort, or the Regent, is now punishable on the same level as public officials in their official capacity, which adds one third to the maximum severity of the punishment for regular criminalisation of insulting of three months in prison (maximum) and/or a fine. Prosecutions do still take place. On 23 January 2020, an individual was sentenced to 40 hours community service for insulting the Dutch Queen Máxima Zorreguieta, referring to her as the daughter of a murderer (she is the daughter of Jorge Horacio Zorreguieta, who served as a minister in the Argentine military regime of Jorge Rafael Videla).

Poland

In Poland, it is illegal to insult foreign heads of state publicly.

On 5 January 2005, left-wing magazine Nie publisher Jerzy Urban was sentenced by a Polish court to a fine of 20,000 złoty (about €5,000, £3,400 or US$6,200) for having insulted Pope John Paul II, a visiting head of state.
On 26–27 January 2005, 28 human rights activists were temporarily detained by the Polish authorities for allegedly insulting Vladimir Putin, a visiting head of state. The activists were released after about 30 hours and only one was actually charged with insulting a foreign head of state.

Article 135 of the Polish penal code states that anyone who publicly insults the President of Poland is punishable by up to three years of imprisonment. Prior to March 2021, the Polish Constitutional Tribunal declared the law consistent with the Polish constitution and Polish international treaty obligations, arguing that the effective carrying out of the duties of the president requires having authority and being especially respected.

, there had been at least one conviction, and there were several ongoing legal cases under the law. In December 2020, a man in Toruń was sentenced to six months of community service, 20 hours per month, under lèse-majesté, for having drawn a male sex organ on a poster of president Andrzej Duda. The man's act of writing "five years of shame" on the poster and drawing an "X" symbol on the president's image were not considered insulting by the judge in the final hearing. On 23 March 2021, three pupils appeared in court in Kalisz for a 10-minute incident in June 2020 in Sulmierzyce, in which a family member of a town councillor video-recorded the pupils pulling down a poster of president Andrzej Duda, cutting the poster, using insulting words, and proposing to burn the poster. , the three pupils risked three years' imprisonment under lèse-majesté. The writer and journalist Jakub Żulczyk was charged under lèse-majesté in March 2021 for referring to Polish president Andrzej Duda as a "moron" in online social media in the context of comments criticising Duda's description of Joe Biden's 2020 United States presidential election victory.

Russia
In March 2019, the Russian Federal Assembly passed a law criminalising publication of online statements that are found "indecent" or "disrespectful" towards Russian state or government officials (including the president), stipulating fines of up to 100,000 roubles for first-time offenders, and 200,000 roubles or up to 15 days imprisonment for repeat.

Spain

Articles 490 and 491 of the criminal code govern lèse-majesté (in Spanish injurias a la Corona 'lit. injuries to the Crown'). Any person who defames or insults the king, the queen, their ancestors or their descendants can be imprisoned for up to two years. The Spanish satirical magazine El Jueves was fined for violation of Spain's lèse-majesté laws after publishing an issue with a caricature of the then Prince of Asturias, current King Felipe VI, and his wife engaging in sexual intercourse on the cover of one of their issues in 2007.

On 23 December 2020, the Audiencia Nacional summoned 12 individuals accused of offence against the crown for having pulled down mock statues of Christopher Columbus and incumbent King Felipe VI on the Day of Hispanity in Pamplona earlier that year, following a report drawn up by the National Police and Civil Guard, as stated by the accused.

On 13 March 2018, the European Court of Human Rights ruled against Spain for punishing with prison two protesters in Girona, Catalonia, convicted of burning pictures depicting the King of Spain. On 17 February 2021, there were huge protests over Catalan rapper Pablo Hasél's arrest for violation of lèse-majesté laws. Later that year, Belgium denied the extradition to Spain of the Catalan rapper Valtonyc, prosecuted for allegedly insulting the king and incitement to terrorism.

Switzerland
In Switzerland, it is illegal to insult foreign heads of state publicly.

Any person who publicly insults a foreign state in the person of its head of state, the members of its government, its diplomatic representatives, its official delegates to a diplomatic conference taking place in Switzerland, or one of its official representatives to an international organisation or department thereof based or sitting in Switzerland is liable to a custodial sentence not exceeding three years or to a monetary penalty.

Middle East

Jordan
In September 2012, pro-reform activists faced charges of lèse-majesté following protests in two locations in Jordan. The protests turned violent after the activists reportedly chanted slogans against the Jordanian regime and insulted King Abdullah II and the Royal Court.

In August 2014, Mohammad Saeed Baker, a member of the Muslim Brotherhood's shura council, was arrested in Jordan and sentenced to six months in prison for lèse-majesté. He was released in February 2015.
In April 2021 following an incident where a female Jordanian was sentenced for lèse-majesté after saying that she believes her father is better than the king, King Abdullah II instructed courts to abandon ruling in cases related to lèse-majesté in Jordan.

Kuwait
In the State of Kuwait, lèse-majesté is punishable with two years in jail, if charged.
In January 2009, there was a diplomatic incident between Australia and Kuwait over an Australian woman being held for allegedly insulting the Emir of Kuwait during a fracas with Kuwaiti immigration authorities.

Qatar
In 2013, a Qatari poet was sentenced to 15 years in prison for criticizing former Emir Hamad bin Khalifa Al Thani.

Saudi Arabia
Under the counterterrorism law that took effect in 2014, actions that "threaten Saudi Arabia’s unity, disturb public order, or defame the reputation of the state or the king" are considered acts of terrorism. The offense may carry harsh corporal punishment, including lengthy jail terms and even death, the sentences may be determined on a per case basis owing to the arbitrary nature of the Saudi legal system.

Turkey
Under Turkish law it is illegal to insult the Turkish nation, the Turkish Republic, Turkish government institutions, and Turkish national heroes. It is also illegal to insult the President of Turkey, with the scope of such indictment affecting comical and satirical depictions. 
Bahadir Baruter and Ozer Aydogan, two Turkish cartoonists from Penguen, were arrested for insulting President Recep Tayyip Erdoğan.
In March 2016, German satirist Jan Böhmermann insulted President Recep Tayyip Erdoğan in his late-night show Neo Magazin Royale.
On 18 September 2020, the lawyer of Turkey's president, Huseyin Aydin, filed a complaint against Greek newspaper Dimokratia over a derogatory headline run. The headline, "Siktir Git Mr. Erdogan", meaning "Fuck off Mr. Erdogan" in Turkish, appeared next to the photo of the president. The headline also included an English translation.
In October 2020, a French political comic magazine, Charlie Hebdo, faced possible charges in Turkey over insulting President Recep Tayyip Erdoğan. The cover of the magazine involves Recep lifting his wife's dress while he was sitting in the chair drunk.

Africa

Mauritius

Mauritians are routinely prosecuted for statements deemed offensive to the members of Jugnauth Government (in power since 2015). In 2019, Patrick Hofman, a former pilot for Air Mauritius, was deported for having called the Prime Minister, Pravind Jugnauth "lunatic". The Prime Minister had the citizenship law changed so that his absolute authorisation is needed for any immigrant who wishes to stay in Mauritius. The law was changed specifically to be able to deport Patrick Hofman as a "prohibited immigrant", thereby ostracizing him and his Mauritian spouse out of the country. When his Mauritian spouse subsequently died, Patrick Hofman was still not allowed to enter Mauritius for her funeral rites. The question was raised directly to the Prime Minister himself in Parliament 

Similary, the social media law has been changed in Mauritius to allow the Government (via the police) to jail anyone who criticizes them on social media. The person targeted has only to feel "annoyed" for the police to arrest the critic. Hassenjee Ruhomaully and his spouse, Farirah Ruhomaully have both (in separate instances) been taken out of bed in the early hours of the morning, to be jailed for having "annoyed" a member of Government. The couple was jailed for having shared on social media, a photo of the spouse of the Prime Minister, Kobita Jugnauth (aka Lady Macbeth) hugging one of their (former) advisors. 

In 2022, a former adviser of the Prime Minister, Gerard Sanspeur (who left after witnessing the blatant corruption and theft by the members of Government), was arrested after commenting on a post about the Minister of ICT. In an operation of damage control where it was proved that the Prime Minister allowed the Indian Government to illegally tap on the SAFE fiber optic cable in total disregard of the consortium of countries who own the cable, the IT Minister (who has no IT background) claimed that a laptop used to tap this cable would have exploded from the amount of data from the SAFE cable.

In October 2022, Bradley Vincent, the athlete who has the highest number of medals ever brought to Mauritius, was suspended for three years  by the Mauritius Olympic Committee for arriving late to the flag raising ceremony in Birmingham where the Prime Minister was present. Bradley Vincent, together with three other athletes came late, as the bus picking them up was delayed in traffic. While the other athletes got away with a severe warning, Bradley Vincent was suspended three years, for having voiced out why the athletes did not get the GBP100 per diem unlike the Government officers.

Morocco
Moroccans are routinely prosecuted for statements deemed offensive to the king. The minimum penalty for such a statement is one year's imprisonment if the statement is made in private (i.e. not broadcast), and three years' imprisonment if it is made in public. In both cases, the maximum is 5 years.

The cases of Yassine Belassal and Nasser Ahmed (a 95-year-old who died in jail after being convicted of lèse-majesté), and the Fouad Mourtada Affair, revived the debate on these laws and their applications. In 2008, an 18-year-old was charged with "breach of due respect to the king" for writing "God, Homeland, Barça" on a school board, in reference to his favorite football club and satirising the national motto ("God, Homeland, King").

In February 2012, 18-year-old Walid Bahomane was convicted for posting two cartoons of the king on Facebook. The procès-verbal cites two Facebook pages and a computer being seized as evidence. Walid was officially prosecuted for "touching the sacralities".

Senegal
Offending the Head of State is punishable by a prison sentence of six months to two years and a fine of 100,000 to 1,500,000 CFA (180 to 2,700 USD).

Zimbabwe
Prosecutions still take place under the Criminal Law (Codification and Reform) Act, punishable by up one year in jail or a fine of up to Z$4,800 (US$13.26),

Asia

Bhutan
Although Bhutan transitioned from an absolute monarchy to a constitutional monarchy in 2008, the country's royalty are considered gods incarnate, making criticism of the royalty punishable under blasphemy laws.

Brunei
Lèse-majesté is a crime in Brunei Darussalam as it is punishable with prison sentences for up to three years.

Cambodia
In February 2018, the Parliament of Cambodia voted to make insulting any monarch punishable with up to one to five years in prison with a fine of 2 to 10 million riels.

In January 2019, a Cambodian man was sentenced to three years in jail for Facebook posts. This is the second sentence handed under the law.

North Korea
The politics of North Korea mandate obedience to the Ten Principles for the Establishment of a Monolithic Ideological System, which in turn require absolute obedience and respect towards the ruling Kim family. For a senior official, disrespect can include greeting the leader with insufficient enthusiasm, as in the case of Jang Song-thaek, who was executed on charges that included clapping half-heartedly upon Kim Jong-un's accession. Reports of officials executed for dozing off in meetings are regularly reported through the South Korean press and Radio Free Asia, although these are rarely confirmed and sometimes denied by the north or later shown to be false.

Malaysia
Malaysia uses the Sedition Act 1948 to charge people for allegedly insulting the royal institution. In 2013, Melissa Gooi and four other friends were detained for allegedly insulting the royal institution.

In 2014, Ali Abd Jalil were detained and served 22 days in prison for insulting the royal family of Johor and Sultan of Selangor. A prison sentence was passed in Johor for attacking the royal family to Muhammad Amirul Azwan Mohd Shakri.

Thailand

Thailand's criminal code has carried a prohibition against lèse-majesté since 1908. In 1932, when Thailand's monarchy ceased to be absolute and a constitution was adopted, it too included language prohibiting lèse-majesté. The 2016 Constitution of Thailand, and all previous versions since 1932, contain the clause, "The King shall be enthroned in a position of revered worship and shall not be violated. No person shall expose the King to any sort of accusation or action." Thai criminal code elaborates in Article 112: "Whoever defames, insults or threatens the King, Queen, the Heir-apparent or the Regent, shall be punished with imprisonment of three to fifteen years." Missing from the code, however, is a definition of what actions constitute "defamation" or "insult". From 1990 to 2005, the Thai court system only saw four or five lèse-majesté cases a year. From January 2006 to May 2011, however, more than 400 cases came to trial, an estimated 15 times increase. Observers attribute the increase to increased polarization following the 2006 military coup and sensitivity over the elderly king's declining health. In 2013, the Supreme Court of Thailand ruled in case no. 6374/2556 that Article 112 of the Penal Code protects the past kings as well as the present one. Criticism or comments which tarnish past kings or the monarchy are punishable by law. However, scholars raised doubts as to how far back lèse-majesté will be applied as the present Thai monarchy (Chakri Dynasty) dates back more than 200 years while other monarchies which ruled Siam can be traced back almost 800 years.

Neither the king nor any member of the royal family has ever personally filed any charges under this law. In fact, during his birthday speech in 2005, King Bhumibol Adulyadej encouraged criticism: "Actually, I must also be criticized. I am not afraid if the criticism concerns what I do wrong, because then I know." He later added, "But the King can do wrong", in reference to those he was appealing to not to overlook his human nature.

Under the NCPO junta which overthrew the democratic regime in May 2014, charges of lèse-majesté have increased significantly, especially against the opponents of the junta. Lèse-majesté is now seeing increasing use as a tool to stifle free speech and dissent in the country. Even the parents of the former princess Srirasmi Suwadee as well as her uncle have been charged with lèse-majesté. On 9 March 2015, a court sentenced her father Apiruj Suwadee and mother Wanthanee for insulting the royal family and lodging a malicious claim. They pleaded guilty to the offenses named and were sentenced to two-and-a-half years in prison. On 9 June 2017 in Bangkok a 33-year-old Thai man by the first name of Wichai was given 35 years imprisonment for posting 10 Facebook photos and comments about the Thai royalty. This sentence was reduced from initial 70 years following a guilty plea made after a year in jail before the trial.

In June 2017, the United Nations called on Thailand to amend its law on lèse-majesté.

South America

Brazil
Brazilian Law contains in its Penal Code three types of criminal offenses against the honor of people in general:

 Slander: Falsely imputing something defined as a crime to someone. With a penalty of detention between six months to two years, and a fine
 Defamation: Falsely imputing an offensive behavior to someone's reputation. With a penalty of detention from three months to one year, and a fine
 Injury: Offending the dignity or decorum of someone. Which has a penalty of detention between one and six months, or a fine.

These penalties can be increased by one third when practiced against the President of the Republic. The Brazilian Penal Code states that crimes against life or freedom of the President of the Republic are subject to Brazilian law, even if committed abroad. The law is also expanded to apply the penalties for slander or defamation against other authorities, such as members of the Federal Senate, the Chamber of Deputies or the Supreme Federal Court, with penalty of imprisonment, from 1 to 4 years.

In March 2019, the Supreme Federal Court opened an investigation which has been handled in secrecy at the Court, to investigate attacks and fake news involving the court and its members. The inquiry has been heavily criticized by the media because of its use to censor articles published by newspapers, including one about a member of the court being possibly named by Marcelo Odebrecht in a ramification of the Operation Car Wash. The criticized inquiry is still ongoing and has been used by the court to request other actions, including the investigation of some supporters of the president of the country, Jair Bolsonaro, causing a crisis between the two branches of the Brazilian government.

Former laws

Asia

Japan

Laws against offending the Emperor of Japan were in place between 1880 and 1947, when the law was abolished, during the United States-led Allied occupation. The last person to be convicted of the crime was Shōtarō Matsushima, a factory worker and member of the Japanese Communist Party. During a 1946 protest against food shortages in front of the Imperial Palace, during which the protesters demanded entry into the palace kitchens which were said to be stocked with staple foods, Matsushima wielded a placard reading, on the one side, "Imperial Edict: The Emperor system has been preserved. I, the Emperor, have eaten to my heart's content, but you, my subjects, should starve to death! Signed, (Imperial Seal)". The other side demanded that the Emperor give a public accounting of the food shortages. Matsushima was arrested and charged with impairing the dignity of the Emperor. The Allied occupation authorities intervened and had the charges reduced to libel. Matsushima was convicted and sentenced to eight months in prison, but was pardoned immediately under an Imperial amnesty commemorating the new Constitution.

Europe

Norway

Following the 2005 Penal Code (introduced in 2015), lèse-majesté is no longer considered a criminal offense.

The 1902 Penal Code, article 101, provided a fine or up to five years of prison for lèse-majesté. According to article 103, prosecution had to be ordered or accepted by the king. Article 101 stated: "If any defamation is exercised against the King or the Regent, the guilty is punished with a fine or up to five years of prison."

Sweden
In Sweden, the laws for lèse-majesté were cancelled in 1948.

United Kingdom
The Treason Felony Act of 1848 makes it an offence to advocate for the abolition of the monarchy. Such advocation is punishable by up to life imprisonment under the Act. Though still in the statute book, the law is no longer enforced.

Section 51 of the Criminal Justice and Licensing (Scotland) Act 2010 abolished the common law criminal offences of sedition and "leasing-making" in Scottish law. The latter offence was considered an offence of lèse-majesté or making remarks critical of the monarch of the United Kingdom. The final prosecution for this offence had occurred in 1715.

See also
Alien and Sedition Acts
Article 301 (Turkish Penal Code)
Blasphemy
Defamation
Flag desecration
Insubordination
Mutiny
Sedition
Streisand effect
Treason

References

Further reading

External links 
 

 
Crimes
Speech crimes
Monarchy
Freedom of speech
Freedom of expression
Censorship
Honor